Rabbi Naftali Riff Yeshiva was a private Jewish boarding school academy originally located in South Bend, Indiana, and later relocated to Indianapolis, Indiana. Founded in 1984 by Rabbi Yisrael Gettinger, it became Indiana's first rabbinical college in 1987. The yeshiva is no longer active in Indianapolis.

Outside reference websites 

 https://web.archive.org/web/20120626224317/http://www.riffyeshiva.org/    Yeshiva website
 http://www.education.com/schoolfinder/us/indiana/indianapolis/the-rabbi-naftali-riff-yeshiva/    Education.com 
 https://web.archive.org/web/20120702025729/https://www.education.com/schoolfinder/us/indiana/indianapolis/the-rabbi-naftali-riff-yeshiva/   (archived COPY of the) Education.com entry for this school 
 https://www.privateschoolreview.com/the-rabbi-naftali-riff-yeshiva-profile   another (more up-to-date ... as of 2020) entry for this school [from "privateschoolreview.com"] 
 http://www.schooldigger.com/go/IN/schools/9999910905/school.aspx    SchoolDigger.com

Orthodox yeshivas in the United States
Private high schools in Indiana